Kannan Oru Kai Kuzhandhai is a 1978 Indian Tamil-language film directed by N. Venkatesh and produced by Tirupur Mani. The film stars Sivakumar, Sumithra and Sowcar Janaki. It was released on 8 September 1978.

Plot 

Kannan, an educated man, who joins a radio shop, where Vasantha is working as a typist, gets an accommodation in the same building where Vasantha is residing by bluffing that he has a widowed mother. When Vasantha and her mother pester him to bring his mother, he makes a shady character, Vasu's mother, who had left him in desperation, to pose as his mother. Vasu's mother sacrifices her life in trying to save Kannan from her son. Vasantha and Kannan are united.

Cast 
 Sivakumar
 Sumithra
 Sathyaraj
 Sowcar Janaki
 Manorama as the heroine's mother
Jai Ganesh
Major Sundarrajan
Surulirajan
Manorama
Neelu
Sathyapriya

Production 
Kannan Oru Kai Kuzhandhai was the second film for Sathyaraj as actor, and first as production manager. In the opening credits, he was billed by his real name S. N. Rangaraj for his role as the production manager, and by his stage name Sathyaraj for his acting role. The film was directed by N. Venkatesh, and produced by Tirupur Mani under Vivekananda Pictures.

Soundtrack 
The soundtrack was composed by Ilaiyaraaja. The song "Megame Thoothaga Vaa" is set in the Carnatic raga known as Pahadi.

Reception 
The film did not do well at the box-office. According to Sivakumar, if a film is full of fight scenes and tragic events, it would not satisfy everyone, so it became ridiculous to make a weak story by relying only on comedy.

References

External links 
 

1970s Tamil-language films
1978 drama films
Films scored by Ilaiyaraaja
Indian drama films